Paul Jefferson (born August 15, 1958, in Woodside, California, United States) is an American country music artist. Managed by Steven McClintock and McJames Music from 1993 through 1999 and then by Anastasia Pruit. Jefferson has released one studio album on Almo Sounds produced by Garth Fundis; he also charted three singles on the Billboard Hot Country Singles & Tracks chart. His highest charting single, "Check Please," co-written with singer songwriter Jon Michaels, peaked at No. 50 in 1996.

In 2004, Jefferson recorded one album with Porter Howell, then formerly of Little Texas, in the band Hilljack.

As a songwriter, Jefferson has had his songs recorded by Keith Urban and Buddy Jewell, among others. He also co-wrote Aaron Tippin's Number One song "That's as Close as I'll Get to Loving You." He is married to Canadian country singer Lisa Brokop. In 2010, Brokop and Jefferson formed The Jeffersons and released their debut album on June 7, 2011, via Royalty Records. In 2017, Paul reconnected with his early manager, Steven McClintock (Tiffany, Shiny Toy Guns, Juice Newton, Robin Schulz, Pingpong fame), to produce the Brookhollow Road CD on 37 Records.

Discography

Albums

Singles

Featured singles

Music videos

References

External links
[ allmusic ((( Paul Jefferson > Overview )))]

1961 births
American country singer-songwriters
American male singer-songwriters
Living people
Almo Sounds artists
People from Woodside, California
Country musicians from California
Singer-songwriters from California